The 2021–22 ZhHL season was the seventh season of the Zhenskaya Hockey League (ZhHL) since the league was established in 2015. It was the 27th season in which the women's ice hockey Russian Championship was contested. SKIF Nizhny Novgorod were the regular season champions after leading the league standings from November onwards.

The KRS Vanke Rays defeated SKIF Nizhny Novgorod in a sweep of the playoff finals to claim their second ZhHL Championship.

Teams 

*Temporary relocation for 2021–22 season; 
†Team folded after 19 games played

Standings 
The regular season began on 22 September 2021 and concluded on 30 March 2022, with the eight most successful teams securing playoff berths.

Player statistics

Scoring leaders 
The following skaters lead the league in points at the conclusion of games played on 30 March 2022.
{| class="wikitable sortable" style="text-align: center"
!
! style="width: 10em;" |Player
! style="width: 10em;" |Team
!
! style="width: 3em;" |
! style="width: 3em;" |
! style="width: 3em;" |
! style="width: 3em;" |
!+/−
! style="width: 3em;" |
|-
|1
| style="text-align:left;" |
| style="text-align:left;" |Tornado
|F
|34
|31
|52
!83
|26
|16
|-
|2
| style="text-align:left;" |
| style="text-align:left;" |Tornado
|F
|34
|14
|42
!56
|26
|20
|-
|3
| style="text-align:left;" |
| style="text-align:left;" |Biryusa
|F
|32
|31
|21
!52
|25
|16
|-
|4
| style="text-align:left;" | 
| style="text-align:left;" |Agidel
|F
|32
|25
|26
!51
|41
|18
|-
|5
| style="text-align:left;" | 
| style="text-align:left;" |SKIF
|F
|36
|14
|35
!49
|41
|14
|-
|6
| style="text-align:left;" | 
| style="text-align:left;" |SKIF
|D
|36
|10
|36
!46
|40
|16
|-
|7
| style="text-align:left;" | 
| style="text-align:left;" |Tornado
|D
|34
|15
|29
!44
|15
|38
|-
|8
| style="text-align:left;" | 
| style="text-align:left;" |SKIF
|F
|36
|23
|20
!43
|33
|28
|-
|9
| style="text-align:left;" |
| style="text-align:left;" |Dinamo-Neva
|F
|34
|22
|21
!43
|20
|35
|-
|10
| style="text-align:left;" |
| style="text-align:left;" |Agidel
|F
|23
|14
|29
!43
|38
|41
|}
The following players were the top goal scorers of teams not represented in the top ten of the league, listed with their overall league rank:

 29. Alexandra Nesterova (F), MSMO 7.62: 34 GP, 14 G, 11 A, 25 Pts, −10, 28 PIM
 #. Anna Timofeyeva (F), SKSO: 34 GP, 18 G, 5 A, 23 Pts, −21, 4 PIM
 #. Kassy Betinol (F), KRS Vanke Rays: 22 GP, 10 G, 11 A, 21 Pts, +17, 14 PIM
 #. Tatyana Shatalova (F), Belye Medveditsy: 19 GP, 7 G, 7 A, 14 Pts, −4, 12 PIM
 #. Mariya Lobur (F), Ice Wings: 18 GP, 4 G, 7 A, 11 Pts, –42, 14 PIM

Top goaltenders 
The following goaltenders lead the league in save percentage at the conclusion of games played on 30 March 2022, while playing a minimum of 840 minutes.

Playoffs 
The 2022 ZhHL playoffs began on 6 April. The KRS Vanke Rays claimed their second ZhHL Championship on 26 April after concluding a three game sweep of SKIF Nizhny Novgorod.

Quarterfinals 
All game times in Moscow Time (UTC+03:00)
(1) SKIF vs. (8) Belye Medveditsy
 

(2) KRS Vanke Rays vs. (7) MSMO 7.62
 

(3) Agidel vs. (6) Dinamo-Neva
 
 

(4) Biryusa vs. (5) Tornado

Semifinals 
All game times in Moscow Time (UTC+03:00)
(1) SKIF vs. (6) Dinamo-Neva
 

(2) KRS Vanke Rays vs. (5) Tornado

Player statistics
Scoring leaders

The following players led the league in playoff point scoring at the conclusion of the semifinals on 19 April 2022.

The following players were the top goal scorers of teams not represented in the top ten of the league, listed with their overall league rank (if available):

 15. Olga Sosina (F), Agidel: 3 GP, 2 G, 2 A, 4 Pts, 0 PIM
 17. Valeria Pavlova (F), Biryusa: 2 GP, 2 G, 1 A, 3 Pts, 0 PIM
 –. Yulia Nuyaksheva (F), MSMO 7.62: 1 GP, 1 G, 0 A, 1 Pt, 0 PIM / Mariya Shirshova (F), MSMO 7.62: 1 GP, 1 G, 0 A, 1 Pt, 2 PIM

Belye Medveditsy was shutout in both games played and, as such, none of their players scored a point in the playoffs.

Top goaltenders

The following goaltenders lead the league in playoff save percentage at the conclusion of the semifinals on 19 April 2022.

ZhHL Championship Finals
All game times in Moscow Time (UTC+03:00)

References

External links 
 Official website 

ZhHL
ZhHL
Zhenskaya Hockey League